Sir Geoffrey William Gerald Agnew (11 July 1908 – 22 November 1986) was an English art dealer, the chairman of the family firm of art dealers, Thomas Agnew & Sons, and the "dean of London art dealers".

Early life
Geoffrey Agnew was born on 11 July 1908, the son of Charles Gerald Agnew and his wife, Olive Mary Agnew (née Danks), and the grandson of Charles Morland Agnew. He was educated at Eton, followed by Trinity College, Cambridge.

Career
He joined Agnew's in 1931, rising to managing director in 1937.

Personal life
He married Doreen Jessel in 1934, whom he met when she was one of the original intake at London's Courtauld Institute.

They had three children:
Julian Agnew, the last chairman of Agnew's before it was sold in 2013 after 195 years in the family
Jonathan Agnew, a banker, CEO of Kleinwort Benson
Mrs Jennifer Lazell

References

1908 births
1986 deaths
People educated at Eton College
Alumni of Trinity College, Cambridge
Geoffrey
Art dealers from London
Knights Bachelor
20th-century English businesspeople